Nantenine is an alkaloid found in the plant Nandina domestica as well as some Corydalis species. It is an antagonist of both the α1-adrenergic receptor and the serotonin 5-HT2A receptor, and blocks both the behavioral and physiological effects of MDMA in animals.

See also

References

5-HT2A antagonists
Alpha-1 blockers
Antidotes
Aporphine alkaloids
Phenol ethers